Flavius Theodosius may refer to:

 Count Theodosius, father of Theodosius I
 Theodosius I, Roman emperor from 379 to 395
 Theodosius II, Roman emperor from 402 to 450
 Flavius Valila Theodosius